Raja Al Gurg is a businesswoman who lives in Dubai in the United Arab Emirates. She is the Chairperson of the 
Easa Saleh Al Gurg Group and a Board Member of the Dubai Chamber of Commerce and Industry. Raja Easa Al Gurg has been ranked 28th 
in the Arab Power 2018 listing of the 100 Most Powerful Arabs, compiled by Gulf Business 
magazine rising from the previous ranking in 2017. She was the most powerful Emirati Businesswoman in Forbes Middle East's 2017 ranking  and the third most influential businesswoman in the Arab world in 
Forbes Middle East's 100 Most Powerful Arab Businesswomen for 2017, ranking. As of 2020 she is listed 89th among the World’s 100 Most Powerful Women by Forbes.

Educational Background
Raja Al Gurg graduated from Kuwait University in 1977 with a degree in English Literature and served as headmistress of Zabeel Secondary School for Girls from 1978 to 1989. In 1989 Al Gurg joined the board of directors of the Easa Saleh Al Gurg Group and is currently the Group's Managing Director.

In September 2003, Al Gurg, along with Sheikha Lubna Al-Qasimi, led a delegation of Dubai businesswomen to the US - Arab Economic Forum.

In December 2019, Dr. Raja Easa Al Gurg released her autobiography, entitled "Raja Al Gurg - An Autobiography." She is the first Emirati businesswoman to write and release an autobiography.

Forbes placed Al Gurg in third place on its 2020 100 Most Powerful Arab Businesswomen List. 18 women from the UAE made this year's list, followed closely by Egypt with 16.

Other positions
Apart from her position with the Easa Saleh Al Gurg Group, Al Gurg also holds a number of positions with other companies and organisations. In March 2020, the National Bank of Fujairah appointed Al Gurg as the new Deputy Chairperson of its board. She takes over this position from her father, Easa Saleh Al Gurg.
She is the Vice Chairperson of the Board of Directors, Dubai Healthcare City Authority; 
 Vice Chairperson of the Board of Trustees, Mohammed Bin Rashid University of Medicine and Health Sciences,
Board member of the Dubai Chamber Of Commerce & Industry (DCCI) and Dubai Women's Association. Raja Al Gurg is the first Emirati woman on the board 
of HSBC Bank Middle East Limited and is also on the advisory board of Coutts Bank, the wealth division of the Royal Bank of Scotland Group. Raja Al Gurg is also on the board of trustees for the Mohammed Bin Rashid Al Maktoum Global Initiatives - one of the largest development and community foundations in the Middle East. 
She was awarded an Honorary Doctorate at Queen's University Belfast for services to business and commerce.

References

Living people
Kuwait University alumni
Emirati women in business
Year of birth missing (living people)